This is a list of members of the Irish House of Commons between 1761 and 1768. There were 300 MPs at a time in this period, who sat from October 1761 to May 1768 unless stated otherwise.

References
 
 

761